Wyandot County Airport  is a public airport located  northwest of Upper Sandusky, Ohio, United States. It is owned and operated by the County Airport Authority.

Facilities and aircraft 
For the 12-month period ending December 31, 2012, the airport had 7,410 aircraft operations, 93.1% general aviation, 6.7% air taxi and less than 1% military.

References

External links 

Airports in Ohio